Campagne-lès-Wardrecques is a commune in the Pas-de-Calais department in the Hauts-de-France region of France.

Geography
Campagne-lès-Wardrecques is a village situated 5 miles (8 km) southeast of Saint-Omer, on the D200 road, near the junction of the N42 and N43 roads. The Neufosse Canal passes by the commune.

Population

Places of interest
 The church of St. Martin, dating from the sixteenth century.

See also
Communes of the Pas-de-Calais department

References

Campagneleswardrecques